The Students' Association of the University of Adelaide (SAUA) was a student representative body that existed at the University of Adelaide from 1973 until 2007. It was one of a number of student organisations that was affiliated to and funded by the Adelaide University Union through the government sanctioned 'Union Fee'. Prior to 1973, an SRC had represented student interests at the University. Former Presidents of the SRC include John Bannon, Gordon Bilney and Julia Gillard.

The SAUA had representative members on many of the University's committees, gave comment in the media and made submissions to government inquiries about issues that affected students and young people in general. It also regularly ran events and awareness campaigns.

The SAUA held annual elections to elect students to its various office-bearer positions as well as positions on the governing council. Notable past Presidents include Natasha Stott Despoja, Sarah Hanson-Young, Stephen Mullighan and Christopher Pyne as Vice-President. Other notable past members include Anne McEwen, Andrew Southcott, Peter Malinauskas, David Penberthy and Annabel Crabb.

Due to the introduction of voluntary student unionism by the Howard government, the Adelaide University Union underwent a significant restructure and the SAUA was replaced by an SRC in 2007.

Ana Obradovic is the current SRC president in 2022.

Structure of the defunct SAUA
SAUA President + SAUA Council (8 Elected Members + SAUA Office Bearers)
Education Department – Education Officer + Education Standing Committee
Women’s Department  - Women’s Officer + Women’s Standing Committee
Activities and Campaigns Department – Activities Officer + Activities Standing Committee
Sexuality Department – Male Sexuality Officer, Female Sexuality Officer+ Sexuality standing Committee
Environment Department – Environment Officer + Environment Standing Committee
Aboriginal and Torres Strait Islander Department + ATSI Officer + ATSI Standing Committee.

Student Media was not a committee but included annually elected editors – On Dit: Adelaide University Student Newspaper + Student Radio (Broadcast on Radio Adelaide)

Structure of the current SRC
SRC President
General Secretary
Education Officer
Welfare Officer
Women's Officer
Queer Officer
Disability Officer
Social Justice Officer
International Officer
Postgraduate Officer
Rural Officer
Mature Age Officer
Ethnocultural Officer
Environment Officer
Aboriginal and Torres Strait Islander (ATSI) Officer
Eight General Councillor positions
AUU President (Ex Officio)

References

University of Adelaide
Students' unions in Australia